The Division I First-Team All-Americans is an annual list honoring the best performing NCAA Division I women's U.S. college soccer players of the season as selected by United Soccer Coaches (formerly known as the National Soccer Coaches Association of America (NSCAA)).

Throughout its history, the NSCAA All-America teams have not necessarily included exactly eleven players, nor has there been consistency with regards to the positions picked or number of players in each position. The selection was also open to Division II and Division III players until 1988 when it became exclusively for Division I players.

Teams

1980–1985
From 1980 to 1985, the National Soccer Coaches Association of America (NSCAA) selected one All-America team that combined all three divisions.

* – Asterisks indicate number of previous All-America selections

1986–1987
From 1986 to 1987, Division I and Division II continued to select one combined team. Division III selected its own team.

* – Asterisks indicate number of previous All-America selections

1988–present
Starting in 1988, all three divisions selected their own teams.

* – Asterisks indicate number of previous All-America selections

References

External links
 

College soccer trophies and awards in the United States
Soccer in the United States lists